Sakura (さくら, サクラ) is a common feminine Japanese given name which can also be used as a surname.

Possible writings 
Sakura can be written using different kanji characters and can mean:
as a given name
 桜, "cherry blossom" (morphologically derived from 櫻)
 櫻, "cherry blossom"
 咲良, "bloom, good"
The given name can also be written in hiragana or katakana.
as a surname
 佐倉、桜、沙倉

People

Given name 
, Japanese women's basketball player
 Sakura Fujiwara (藤原 さくら, born 1995), Japanese singer-songwriter and actress
, Japanese shogi player
Sakura Miyawaki (宮脇 咲良, born 1998), Japanese singer and member of South Korean girl group Le Sserafim
, Japanese table tennis player
 Sakura Nogawa (野川 さくら, born 1978), Japanese voice actress
 Sakura Oda (小田 さくら, born 1999), a Japanese singer and member of the J-pop girl group Morning Musume
 Sakura Tange (丹下 桜, born 1973), Japanese voice actress and singer
 Sakura Tsukagoshi (塚越 さくら, born 1991), Japanese cyclist
 Sakura Tsukuba (筑波 さくら), a Japanese manga artist
 Sakura Ando  (安藤 サクラ, born 1986), Japanese actress

Surname 
 Momoko Sakura (さくら ももこ, 1965–2018), Japanese manga artist and the main character depicted in her own manga Chibi Maruko-chan
 Emi Sakura (さくら えみ, born 1976), Japanese professional wrestler
 Ayane Sakura (佐倉 綾音 born 1994), Japanese voice actress
 Nichole Sakura (born 1989), American actress and model

Stage name 
 Sakura (musician) (real name Yasunori Sakurazawa 櫻澤 泰徳, born 1969), Japanese musician and former drummer of the rock band L'Arc~en~Ciel
 Sakura Candle (born 1979), Japanese professional wrestler
 Rock M. Sakura, American drag queen

Fictional characters

Given name 
 Sakura (さくら), the younger sister of Tora-san in the film series Otoko wa Tsurai yo
 Sakura (Daisy), a character in the Pokémon anime series
 Princess Sakura (サクラ), alternate self of Sakura Kinomoto in Tsubasa: Reservoir Chronicle
 Sakura (Urusei Yatsura) (サクラ), a character from the manga and anime franchise Urusei Yatsura
 Sakura Akamatsu (紗孔羅), a character from the Betterman anime series
 Sakura Amamiya, a character from the game Project Sakura Wars
 Sakura Haruno (春野 サクラ), a heroine of the manga and anime series Naruto
 Sakura Haruno (春野 桜), a main character in Wandaba Style
 Sakura Kakei (筧 朔羅), a character from the manga Get Backers
 Sakura Kaname (要 咲良), a character from the anime Fafner in the Azure
 Sakura Kasugano (春日野 さくら), a character from the Street Fighter series of fighting games
 Sakura Kinomoto (木之本 さくら), the main heroine of the manga and anime series Cardcaptor Sakura. In the English dub of the original anime titled Cardcaptors, her name is Sakura Avalon.
 Sakura Kitaōji (北大路 さくら), a character in anime series Aikatsu!
 Sakura Kiyashiki (春野 サクラ), a character of the manga and anime series Assassination Classroom
 Sakura Kono (河野 桜), a character from the manga and anime Hori-san to Miyamura-kun (Horimiya)
 Sakura Kusakabe (草壁桜), main character of the Bludgeoning Angel Dokuro-Chan anime
 Sakura Mamiya (真宮 桜), a main character from the manga Rin-ne
 Sakura Matō (間桐 桜), a main character in the adult visual novel Fate/Stay Night
 Sakura Minamoto, a character from the MAPPA idol anime series Zombie Land Saga
 Sakura Nishihori (西堀 さくら), main character from the 2006 tokusatsu television series, GoGo Sentai Boukenger
 Sakura Ogawa (小川さくら), a character from the novel, manga, and film Battle Royale
 Sakura Rokujo, a main character from the anime and manga series Tokko
 Sakura Sakurakouji (桜小路 桜), the main character in the manga series Code: Breaker
 Sakura Shinguji (真宮寺 さくら), a character from the Sakura Wars video games, anime and manga
 Sakura Yae (八重 桜), a character from the manga and game Really? Really!
 Sakura Yamauchi (山内桜良, Yamauchi Sakura), a character of the novel, manga and anime series I Want to Eat Your Pancreas
 Sakura Yoshino (芳乃さくら), a major character from the D.C.: Da Capo games and anime

Surname 
 Chiyo Sakura (佐倉 千代), the viewpoint character in the series Monthly Girls' Nozaki-kun
 Kyoko Sakura, (佐倉 杏子), a main character in the series Puella Magi Madoka Magica
 Mikan Sakura (佐倉 蜜柑), main character of the anime Alice Academy
 Momoko Sakura (さくら ももこ), main character's real name in the shōjo manga series Chibi Maruko-chan
 Hane Sakura, main character in Bakuon!!

See also 
 Sakura (disambiguation)

External links 

Given names derived from plants or flowers
Japanese feminine given names
Japanese-language surnames